M1943 can refer to a variety of weapons & garments:
 U.S. Army M1943 Uniform
152 mm howitzer M1943 (D-1)
160mm Mortar M1943
Halcon M-1943
76 mm regimental gun M1943
57 mm anti-tank gun M1943 (ZiS-2)